Anubis II is an 2005 action game from UK based developer Data Design Interactive. The game was published by Conspiracy Entertainment in the United States.

Gameplay
Set in ancient Egypt, the player controls Anubis, the guardian of the Underworld, in his quest to lift the Curse of the pharaohs. The Nunchuk controls Anubis while the Wii Remote swings the Scepter of Ra and throws Canopic Bombs.

Reception

The game has received overwhelmingly negative reviews, in which it holds a rating of 19/100 on review aggregate site Metacritic, it also has a 1.5/10 rating from GameSpot, the second worst score it is possible to receive with the new rating system, and a 2/10 rating from IGN. The Wii version of Anubis II was also nominated for Flat-Out Worst Game of 2007 by GameSpot. Many critics have called it a carbon copy of Ninjabread Man, due to the identical music, gameplay and level layout, the same basic attacks, and enemies (as well as having most of the same bugs and glitches).

See also
Ninjabread Man, another Data Design Interactive game title
Myth Makers: Trixie in Toyland, another Data Design Interactive game title
Rock 'n' Roll Adventures, another Data Design Interactive game title

References

2005 video games
3D platform games
Data Design Interactive games
PlayStation 2 games
Video games based on Egyptian mythology
Video games developed in the United Kingdom
Wii games
Windows games
Single-player video games
Conspiracy Entertainment games
Metro3D games